Na Mom is a district (amphoe) of Songkhla province, southern Thailand.

History
The district was initially the tambon Thung Phra Khian (ทุ่งพระเคียน) of Hat Yai district, which was changed into tambon Na Mom in 1943. On 30 April 1981 it was made the minor district (king amphoe) Na Mom, together with three further tambon from Hat Yai District. It was upgraded to a full district on 4 July 1994.

Geography
Neighboring districts are (from the north clockwise) Mueang Songkhla, Chana, and Hat Yai.

Administration
The district is divided into four sub-districts (tambon), which are further subdivided into 29 villages (muban). There are no municipal (thesaban) areas within the district, and a further four tambon administrative organizations (TAO).

References

External links
amphoe.com

Districts of Songkhla province